The 1st Marine Division Band is a regional military band of the United States Marine Corps, reporting directly to the 1st Marine Division. It is stationed in Camp Pendleton, California. The band serves as the de facto USMC representative for the Western United States, performing at over 300 military and state functions, civic events, and military parades a year.

History
The 1st Marine Division Band was organized during World War II when the division was based in Australia to participate in the Pacific War. On the occasion of President George Washington's birthday in February 1943, the 1st MARDIV Band played Waltzing Matilda, an Australian bush ballad which would later be the official march of the division. The band would play this march again in April of that year during an ANZAC Day parade in Melbourne and would continue to play it exclusively during the division's deployment to Australia. In recent years, all 50 members of the band have taken up arms to serve on the battlefield, especially during the Gulf War, the Iraq War and the Iraq conflict (2003–present). During the lattermost conflict, the band was attached to Headquarters Company, 5th Marine Regiment at Camp Fallujah, Iraq from February 2006–January 2007. During this deployment, the band served as a security platoon. In 2008, the band was awarded the "Colonel George S. Howard Citation of Musical Excellence for Military Concert Bands" by the John Philip Sousa Foundation. In 2006, the band took part in the State funeral of President Gerald Ford and has annually taken part in the Rose Parade as part of the USMC West Coast Composite Band.

Ensembles
The following ensembles are subordinated to the 1st MARDIV Band:

 Ceremonial Band
 Concert Band
 Party Band
 Brass Quintet
 Rock Band

Gallery

Sources

External links

1st Marine Division Band on YouTube
1st Marine Division Band
Camp Pendleton's 1st Marine Division Band Jams by KNSD

Bands of the United States Marine Corps
Wind bands
Musical groups established in 1940